Hammond Township is one of nine townships in Spencer County, Indiana. As of the 2010 census, its population was 1,727 and it contained 725 housing units.  Hammond Township contains the city of Grandview.

History
The Hammond family settled in Hammond Township in about 1814.

Geography

Cities and towns
Grandview

Unincorporated towns
Newtonville

References

External links
 Indiana Township Association
 United Township Association of Indiana

Townships in Spencer County, Indiana
Townships in Indiana